The Mori or Maurya is a Rajput clan which ruled over southwestern Rajasthan and northern Malwa from the 7th century CE and for a period of about 120 years. They controlled the Chittor Fort. The Mori Rajputs were probably the most powerful power in this region before the rise of Pratiharas. Mori is also considered a sub clan of Parmar Rajputs.

History
The Mori Rajputs are mentioned as one of the fourteen branches of the Parmar Rajput clan by British scholars.
Chitrangada Mori, a Mori Rajput ruler, laid the foundation of the fort of Chittorgarh.  A Mori ruler of Chittor has known to have assisted the Chahmana king Visaldeva in a battle against the Turk invaders, probably led by sultan Khusrau Shah or Bahram Shah of Ghazna. The Moris also allied with the Kachhwaha of Amber.

A dynasty belonging to the Mori clan controlled the Chittor Fort and the surrounding region before the Guhila dynasty. The fort of Chittor was a well established citadel in the 8th century under the Moris. The Chittorgarh inscription dated 713 AD gives four names of Mori Rajput rulers of Chittor. 

The Mori rulers were the lords of Malwa. Mahlot, a Mori king of Chittor has been mentioned in the Chach Nama as a relative of King Rai Sahasi of Sindh.

Shyam Manohar Mishra of Lucknow University theorized that Bappa Rawal was originally a vassal of the last Mori ruler Manuraja alias Man Singh Mori. Manuraja was his uncle through his mother, a Parmar princess from Abu or Chandravati. Manuraja is identified with Māna, mentioned in the Chittorgarh Māna-sarovara inscription of 713 AD. Māna was described as the son of Bhoja. Māna's great - grandfather was named Maheśvara.

Bappa probably led the Mori campaign against the Arabs, which made him more famous than his overlord. Later, he either deposed Manuraja and became the king of Chittor with the help of the nobles or became the king after Manuraja died childless. The Moris were expelled from Chittorgarh by Bappa Rawal.

Defeat by the Arabs
According to  C.K. Majumdar, the Moris were ruling at Chittor when the Arabs (mlechchhas) invaded north-western India around 725 CE. The Arabs defeated the Moris, and in turn, were defeated by a confederacy that included Bappa Rawal.

References

Bibliography
 
 
 
 

Rajput clans